Daniel Dunakin (April 19, 1810May 16, 1875) was a Michigan politician.

Early life
Dunakin was born on April 19, 1810 in Niagara County, New York. In 1834, Dunakin settled on a farm in Eckford Township, Michigan.

Career
On November 8, 1854, Dunakin was elected to the Michigan House of Representatives where he represented the Calhoun County 1st district from January 3, 1855 to December 31, 1856.

Personal life
Dunakin was married to Eliza Cook. Dunakin was a Free Will Baptist.

Death
Dunakin died on May 16, 1875. He was interred at Cooks Prairie Cemetery in Clarendon, Michigan.

References

1810 births
1875 deaths
Baptists from Michigan
Farmers from Michigan
Burials in Michigan
Free Will Baptists
People from Niagara County, New York
People from Calhoun County, Michigan
Republican Party members of the Michigan House of Representatives
19th-century American politicians